Michel Kikoïne (Michail Kikóin; 31 May 1892 – 4 November 1968) was a Lithuanian Jewish-French painter.

Life 
Kikoine was born in Rechytsa, present-day Belarus. The son of a Jewish banker in the small southeastern town of Gomel, he was barely into his teens when he began studying at "Kruger's School of Drawing" in Minsk. There he met Chaïm Soutine, with whom he had a lifelong friendship. At age 16, he and Soutine were studying at the Vilnius Academy of Art and in 1911 he moved to join the growing artistic community gathering in the Montparnasse Quarter of Paris, France. This artistic community included his friend Soutine as well as fellow Belarus painter, Pinchus Kremegne who also had studied at the Fine Arts School in Vilnia.

For a time, the young artist lived at La Ruche while studying at  the École nationale supérieure des Beaux-Arts. In 1914, he married a young lady from Vilnia with whom he had a daughter and a son. Their son, Jacques Yankel, born in France in 1920, also became a painter. The same year as his marriage, Kikoine volunteered to fight in the French army, serving until the end of World War I.

With the outbreak of World War II and the subsequent occupation of France by the Germans, Kikoine and his Jewish family faced deportation to the Nazi death camps. Until the end of the War they stayed near Toulouse. After the Allied liberation of France, he moved back to Paris where his paintings were primarily nudes, autoportraits, and portraits. In 1958, he moved to Cannes on the Mediterranean coast where he returned to landscape painting until his death on 4 November 1968.

Career 
Kikoine had his first exhibition in Paris in 1919 after which he exhibited regularly at the Salon d'Automne. His work was successful enough to provide a reasonable lifestyle for him and his family allowing them to spend summers painting landscapes in the south of France, the most notable of which is his "Paysage Cezannien," inspired by Paul Cézanne.  He died in Cannes, France.

Influence 
In 2004, at the university in Tel Aviv, Israel, a new wing in the Genia Schreiber University Art Gallery was dedicated to the memory of Kikoine.

References

External links 
 An artwork by Michel Kikoine at the Ben Uri site

Modern painters
Jewish painters
20th-century French painters
20th-century Russian male artists
French male painters
Belarusian painters
20th-century Russian painters
Russian male painters
Belarusian Jews
People from Rechytsa
1892 births
1968 deaths
Vilnius Academy of Arts alumni
Jewish School of Paris
19th-century French male artists
Emigrants from the Russian Empire to France